Cartmel Fell is a civil parish in the South Lakeland District of Cumbria, England. It contains 34 listed buildings that are recorded in the National Heritage List for England. Of these, three are listed at Grade I, the highest of the three grades, two are at Grade II*, the middle grade, and the others are at Grade II, the lowest grade.  The parish is in the Lake District National Park, and is mainly rural.  Most of the listed buildings are houses and associated structures, farmhouses and farm buildings.  The other listed buildings include a church and items in the churchyard, bridges, a milestone, a war memorial, and a public house


Key

Buildings

See also

Listed buildings in Windermere
Listed buildings in Crook
Listed buildings in Crosthwaite and Lyth
Listed buildings in Witherslack
Listed buildings in Meathop and Ulpha
Listed buildings in Lindale and Newton-in-Cartmel
Listed buildings in Staveley-in-Cartmel

Notes and references

Notes

Citations

Sources

Lists of listed buildings in Cumbria